Cornil is a railway station in Cornil, Nouvelle-Aquitaine, France. The station is located on the Coutras–Tulle railway line. The station is served by TER (local) services operated by the SNCF.

Train services

The station is served by regional trains towards Bordeaux, Brive-la-Gaillarde and Ussel.

References

Railway stations in Corrèze